Glaslough railway station was on the Ulster Railway and is located in the Republic of Ireland.  Upon the Partition of Ireland in 1921 it became the first station south of the border on the line.

The Ulster Railway opened the station on 25 May 1858.

It is understood to have been one of the first in Ireland with flushing toilets.

It closed on 14 October 1957.  Some station building remain but are used for other purposes and the signal box has been reconstructed on the site.

Routes

References

Disused railway stations in County Monaghan
Railway stations opened in 1858
Railway stations closed in 1957